A canal ring is the name given to a series of canals that make a complete loop.

Etymology
There have been canals which formed a ring for more than 200 years, but the term was unknown before the 1960s, when the Inland Waterways Association coined Cheshire Ring as part of its campaign to save the Ashton Canal and Peak Forest Canal from closure.

Working boatmen were concerned with getting from A to B as fast as possible, or for the lowest toll, rather than in visiting more of the system, and what are now known as rings were simply alternative routes to them, but circular routes allow leisure boaters to see twice as much of the system as is possible with an "out and back" cruise. Hire companies are keen to promote their proximity to popular cruising rings.

Since the Cheshire Ring was born, more rings (and variants of them) have been named. The best-known are those that can be completed in one or two weeks, although some three-week rings (such as the Outer Pennine Ring) have been given names, but there are many other unnamed rings.

Notable rings

The Netherlands
Ringvaart

England
See also Canals of Great Britain
 Avon Ring
 River Avon, River Severn, Worcester and Birmingham Canal and Stratford-upon-Avon Canal
Black country ring
Staffordshire and Worcestershire Canal, Trent and Mersey Canal, Coventry Canal (Isolated Section), Birmingham and Fazeley Canal, BCN Main Line
Cheshire Ring
 Rochdale Canal, Ashton Canal, Peak Forest Canal, Macclesfield Canal, Trent and Mersey Canal, Bridgewater Canal
 Droitwich Ring
 Droitwich Barge Canal, Droitwich Junction Canal, Worcester and Birmingham Canal, River Severn 
Four Counties Ring
 Trent and Mersey Canal, Staffordshire and Worcestershire Canal, Shropshire Union Canal, Middlewich Branch, (Wardle Canal)
 Leicestershire Ring
 Trent and Mersey Canal, River Soar, Grand Union Canal, Oxford Canal, Coventry Canal, Birmingham and Fazeley Canal, Coventry Canal (isolated section)
South Pennine Ring
 Rochdale Canal, Calder and Hebble Navigation, Huddersfield Broad Canal, Huddersfield Narrow Canal, Ashton Canal
North Pennine Ring
 Rochdale Canal, Calder and Hebble Navigation, Aire and Calder Navigation, Leeds and Liverpool Canal, Bridgewater Canal
Outer Pennine Ring (Combines the North and South Pennine rings, omitting the section of the Rochdale canal that they share)
 Calder and Hebble Navigation, Aire and Calder Navigation, Leeds and Liverpool Canal, Bridgewater Canal, Rochdale Canal, Ashton Canal, Huddersfield Narrow Canal, Huddersfield Broad Canal
Stourport Ring
 River Severn, Staffordshire and Worcestershire Canal, Stourbridge Canal, Dudley Canals, Birmingham Canal Navigations (Netherton Tunnel Branch Canal and Birmingham New Main Line), Worcester and Birmingham Canal
 The Thames Ring / Great Ring
 River Thames, Oxford Canal, Grand Union Canal
Warwickshire ring
 Coventry Canal, Oxford Canal, Grand Union Canal, Birmingham and Fazeley Canal

Incompletely navigable:
Wessex Ring
River Thames, Kennet and Avon Canal, Wilts and Berks Canal 
This ring is only possible when the Wilts and Berks Canal is fully restored.
North Thames Ring
River Thames, Thames and Severn Canal, North Wilts Canal, Wilts and Berks Canal
This ring is only possible when the Thames and Severn Canal, North Wilts Canal and Wilts and Berks Canal are fully restored.
Cotswolds Ring
Thames and Severn Canal, Stroudwater Navigation, Gloucester and Sharpness Canal, River Severn, River Avon (Warwickshire), Stratford-upon-Avon Canal, Grand Union Canal, Oxford Canal, River Thames 
This ring is only possible when the Thames and Severn Canal and the Stroudwater Navigation are fully restored.
Severn Ring
Montgomery Canal, Llangollen Canal, Shropshire Union Canal, Staffordshire and Worcestershire Canal, River Severn
This ring is only possible when the Montgomery Canal and River Severn are fully restored.
Yorkshire Ring (Currently incomplete)
 Aire and Calder Navigation, Dearne and Dove Canal, Barnsley Canal, River Don Navigation, New Junction Canal
This ring is possible only when the Barnsley and Dearne and Dove Canals are fully restored.

See also

Canals of the United Kingdom
History of the British canal system

References

Canal rings